Reno High School (RHS) is a public secondary school in Reno, Nevada, United States. It is a part of the Washoe County School District. The school's teams are known as the Reno Huskies, and the school colors are red and blue.

History

Reno High was the first high school in Reno, which is celebrated by its slogan: "Reno High - Older than Reno".

High school students in Reno in the 1860s were originally taught in the basement of a building on the corner of First and Virginia Streets, on the future site of the Mapes Hotel. Today there is a city plaza at that location, which is across the street from the Reno City Hall. In 1869 High school students were moved to a one-room school. In 1879, due to Reno's expanding population, a larger high school, called "Central School," was built near Arlington and Fourth Streets.  This was commonly referred to as "Reno High School", and 1879 is the generally accepted year of the school's founding.

In 1910, a fire in the chemistry lab destroyed the school's main building. The school was rebuilt in downtown Reno in 1912, at a location currently occupied by the former Sundowner hotel-casino (a portion of which is now a condominium complex).

In 1951, Reno High was relocated to new facilities, on 71 acres, the campus located on Booth and Foster Streets, just south of the Truckee River and near Idlewild Park.

Extracurricular activities

Athletics
Reno High has won numerous state championships in many sports. The boys' cross country team has been the most dominant, winning 12 state championships (including five consecutive wins). The girls' basketball team won the state championship in 2001, then won back-to-back state and region championships in 2013 and 2014. The Reno High football team won the Nevada state football title in 2003, the Reno baseball team won the state championship in 2004, and the boys' basketball team won the championship in 2006, knocking off North Las Vegas' Rancho High School.

The Reno Huskies compete in the High Desert League of the Northern Nevada 4A Region, which is the large-school level of varsity sports in Nevada.

Since 2003, the Reno High boys' sports varsity teams have won Nevada state championships in football, basketball, baseball, track and field, swimming, diving, tennis, and snow skiing.

On Friday, February 22, 2008, the Reno Huskies defeated Cheyenne High of Las Vegas 76 to 72, for their second state basketball championship in three seasons. The Huskies won at least one state championship in seven different sports in every year from 2002 to 2008.

In 1986, Reno High football placekicker Dirk Borgognone set a world record for the longest high school football field goal . The 68 yard long field goal, which was kicked in a game at Sparks High School is the second-longest in organized American football at any class level, including the NFL, and was just short of Ove Johansson's 69-yard field goal in 1976, for NAIA college school Abilene Christian.

Reno High cross country runner Marie (Mel) Lawrence holds the U.S. high school record in the 2,000 m and 3,000 m steeplechase.

Orchestras
Reno currently has three performing orchestras:

Chamber Orchestra
Sinfonia
Concert Orchestra

The Chamber Orchestra tours each year, participating in college level master-classes and festivals at schools and Universities such as Stanford University, San Francisco State University, San Jose State University and University of the Pacific. Members of the Orchestras audition for and consistently participate in the Reno Philharmonic Youth Symphonies, the Washoe County Honor Orchestra, and the Nevada State Honor Orchestra.

Bands

Wind Ensemble
Jazz Band
Concert Band
Pep Band

The Reno High Jazz Band, Wind Ensemble and Concert Band are ranked highly in the district, winning festivals year round.

Choirs

Vocal Motion
Chorale
Mixed Choir

Performing arts
The Reno High School Theater Program, known as the 'Booth Street Players', presents three to four shows a year, along with outside school community performances. The fall production is a play, and the spring production is a musical. Past shows have included Little Shop of Horrors, Our Town, Grease, The Boy Friend, and Pippin ('Pippin' included students trained in silk aerial acrobatics).

Other activities 
The Speech and Debate team has consecutively won the state championship for 24 years in a row (as of 2019), as well as this, they won the 2020 "Covid Cup". The lack of in person competition prompted the North Nevada Forensic League (NNFL) to cancel the usual sweepstakes, instead opting to have a "Covid Cup" for that year only. The "Covid Cup" applicable competitions all took place online with streaming video. In 2019 the Debate Team  attained 1,000 points in league competition, a first. 

There are many other clubs as well, offered to students at Reno High

Publications

Re-Wa-Ne — school yearbook
The Red & Blue — monthly school newspaper
The Mirror — school literary magazine (publication ceased in 2008)

Notable Reno High alumni
Walter S. Baring Jr. (1929) - U.S. congressman from Nevada
Josh Barrett (2003) - safety for the Denver Broncos and the New England Patriots
Dirk Borgognone (1985) - kicker for the Green Bay Packers
Shawn Boskie (1986) - major league baseball pitcher
Frederic Joseph DeLongchamps (1900) - Nevada State Architect; designer of many well known Nevada buildings
Frank Fahrenkopf (1957) - political adviser to President Reagan and chairman of the Republican National Party
Sean "Hollywood" Hamilton (freshman year only) - national radio personality
Garrett Hampson (2013) - professional baseball player, Colorado Rockies baseball team
Ray Handley (1962) - head coach of the New York Giants
Massimo Manca (1981) - kicker for the Cincinnati Bengals
Don Manoukian (1953) - offensive lineman for the Oakland Raiders and pro wrestler
Patrick Anthony McCarran (1897) - United States senator from Nevada
Sallie Morton (1940s), first female president, American Gem Society
Dorothy Papadakos (1978) - concert organist, playwright, and author
John Savage - UCLA Bruins baseball head coach
Hillary Schieve - mayor of Reno, Nevada
Ben Stevenson (2013) - American water polo player, 2020 Summer Olympics US Mens National Team
Inga Thompson - three-time Olympic Games cyclist
Willy Vlautin (1986) - author of the novels The Motel Life, Northline, Lean on Pete; also the lead vocalist and songwriter for alt-country band Richmond Fontaine
Dawn Wells (1956) - actress, Wells starred in Gilligan's Island as Mary Ann

References

External links

Official school site
Washoe County School District

High schools in Reno, Nevada
 
Educational institutions established in 1879
Washoe County School District
Public high schools in Nevada
1879 establishments in Nevada